Dublin City North was a parliamentary constituency represented in Dáil Éireann, the lower house of the Irish parliament or Oireachtas, from 1923 to 1937 on the northside of Dublin City. The method of election was proportional representation by means of the single transferable vote (PR-STV).

Boundaries
Dublin North was created under the Electoral Act 1923 as an eight-seat borough constituency on the northside of Dublin city from territory that had been part of the Dublin Mid and Dublin North-West constituencies. It was defined by borough electoral areas, each of which contained one or more wards: Dublin No. 1 [Arran Quay], Dublin No. 2 [Clontarf East, Clontarf West, Drumcondra and Glasnevin], Dublin No. 4 [Inns' Quay and Rotunda], Dublin No. 6 [Mountjoy] and Dublin No. 8 [North City and North Dock].

It was abolished with effect at the 1937 general election, when it was replaced by the constituencies of Dublin North-East (3 seats) and Dublin North-West (5 seats).

TDs 1923–1937

Elections

1933 general election

1932 general election

1929 by-election
Following the election of Independent TD Alfie Byrne to Seanad Éireann, a by-election was held on 14 March 1929. The seat was won by the Cumann na nGaedheal candidate Thomas F. O'Higgins.

1928 by-election
Following the disqualification of Irish Worker League TD James Larkin due to bankruptcy, a by-election was held on 3 April 1928. The seat was won by the Cumann na nGaedheal candidate Vincent Rice.

September 1927 general election

June 1927 general election

1925 by-election
Following the resignations of Cumann na nGaedheal TDs Francis Cahill and Seán McGarry, a by-election for both seats was held on 11 March 1925. The first seat was won by the Cumann na nGaedheal candidate Patrick Leonard, and the second by the Republican candidate Oscar Traynor.

1923 general election

See also
Dáil constituencies
Politics of the Republic of Ireland
Historic Dáil constituencies
Elections in the Republic of Ireland

References

External links
Oireachtas Members Database
Dublin Historic Maps: Parliamentary & Dail Constituencies 1780–1969 (a work in progress)
Dublin Historic Maps: Townlands of County Dublin

Dáil constituencies in County Dublin (historic)
1923 establishments in Ireland
1937 disestablishments in Ireland
Constituencies established in 1923
Constituencies disestablished in 1937